Particulates – also known as atmospheric aerosol particles,  atmospheric particulate matter, particulate matter (PM) or suspended particulate matter (SPM) – are microscopic particles of solid or liquid matter suspended in the air. The term aerosol commonly refers to the particulate/air mixture, as opposed to the particulate matter alone. Sources of particulate matter can be natural or anthropogenic. They have impacts on climate and precipitation that adversely affect human health, in ways additional to direct inhalation.

Types of atmospheric particles include suspended particulate matter; thoracic and respirable particles; inhalable coarse particles, designated PM, which are coarse particles with a diameter of 10 micrometers (μm) or less; fine particles, designated PM, with a diameter of 2.5 μm or less; ultrafine particles, with a diameter of 100 nm or less; and soot.

The IARC and WHO designate airborne particulates as a Group 1 carcinogen. Particulates are the most harmful form (other than ultra-fines) of air pollution due to their ability to penetrate deep into the lungs and brain from the blood streams, causing health problems including heart disease, lung disease, and premature death. In 2013, a study involving 312,944 people in nine European countries revealed that there was no safe level of particulates and that for every increase of 10 μg/m in PM, the lung cancer rate rose 22% (95% CI [1.03–1.45]). The smaller PM, which can penetrate deeper into the lungs, were associated with an 18% increase in lung cancer per 5 μg/m; however, this study did not show statistical significance for this association (95% CI [0.96–1.46]) Worldwide exposure to PM contributed to 4.1 million deaths from heart disease and stroke, lung cancer, chronic lung disease, and respiratory infections in 2016. Overall, ambient particulate matter ranks as the sixth leading risk factor for premature death globally.

Atmospheric sources

Some particulates occur naturally, originating from volcanoes, dust storms, forest and grassland fires, living vegetation and sea spray. Human activities, such as the burning of fossil fuels, joss paper, firecrackers and biomass including wood and stubble, construction (activities of building refurbishment or demolition, roadworks, diesel exhausts of the heavy equipments used, emission from the production of building materials, etc.), metalworking (e.g., welding), woodworking, glass reprocessing, agricultural activities (e.g., ploughing and soil tilling), power plants, road dust from tyre and road wear, wet cooling towers in cooling systems and various industrial processes such as mining, smelting and oil refining also generate significant amounts of particulates. Disasters (both natural or caused by humans, e.g, earthquakes, wars, and September 11 attacks, etc.) can result in particulate pollution as well. Microplastics are also gaining attention as a type of airborne PM. Anthropogenic aerosols currently account for about 10 percent of the total mass of aerosols in the atmosphere.

Domestic combustion and wood smoke 

In the United Kingdom domestic combustion is the largest single source of PM2.5 and PM10 annually, with domestic wood burning in both closed stoves and open fires responsible for 38% of PM2.5 in 2019.

To tackle the problem, some new laws were introduced. Starting from May 2021, traditional house coal (bituminous coal) and wet wood, two of the most polluting fuels, can no longer be sold. Wood sold in volumes of less than 2m³ must be certified as 'Ready to Burn', which means it has a moisture content of 20% or less. Manufactured solid fuels must also be certified as 'Ready to Burn' to ensure they meet sulphur and smoke emission limits.

Starting from January 2022, all new wood burning stoves have to meet new EcoDesign standards (Ecodesign stoves produce 450 times more toxic air pollution than gas central heating. Older stoves, which are now banned from sale, produce 3,700 times more).

In 2023, the amount of smoke that burners in "smoke control areas" - most England's towns and cities - can emit per hour is reduced from 5g to 3g. There will be an on-the-spot fine of up to £300 on anyone who found breaking the new measures, and may even get a criminal record if they do not comply.

In some towns and cities in New South Wales wood smoke may be responsible for 60% of fine particle air pollution in the winter.

There are a few ways to reduce wood smoke, e.g, buying the right wood heater and maintaining it well, choosing the right firewood and burning it the right way. There are also regulations in some countries where people can report smoke pollution to the local council.

Composition 

The composition and toxicity of aerosols, including particles, depends on their source and atmospheric chemistry and varies widely.
Wind-blown mineral dust tends to be made of mineral oxides and other material blown from the Earth's crust; this particulate is light-absorbing. Sea salt is considered the second-largest contributor in the global aerosol budget, and consists mainly of sodium chloride originated from sea spray; other constituents of atmospheric sea salt reflect the composition of sea water, and thus include magnesium, sulfate, calcium, potassium, and others. In addition, sea spray aerosols may contain organic compounds, which influence their chemistry.

Some secondary particles derive from the oxidation of primary gases such as sulfur and nitrogen oxides into sulfuric acid (liquid) and nitric acid (gaseous) or from biogenic emissions. The precursors for these aerosols—i.e. the gases from which they originate—may have an anthropogenic origin (from biomass and fossil fuel combustion) as well as a natural biogenic origin. In the presence of ammonia, secondary aerosols often take the form of ammonium salts; i.e. ammonium sulfate and ammonium nitrate (both can be dry or in aqueous solution); in the absence of ammonia, secondary compounds take an acidic form as sulfuric acid (liquid aerosol droplets) and nitric acid (atmospheric gas), all of which probably contribute to the health effects of particulates.

Secondary sulfate and nitrate aerosols are strong light-scatterers. This is mainly because the presence of sulfate and nitrate causes the aerosols to increase to a size that scatters light effectively.

Organic matter (OM) found in aerosols can be either primary or secondary, the latter part deriving from the oxidation of volatile organic compounds (VOCs); organic material in the atmosphere may either be biogenic or anthropogenic. Organic matter influences the atmospheric radiation field by both scattering and absorption. Some aerosols are predicted to include  strongly light-absorbing material and are thought to yield large positive radiative forcing. Some secondary organic aerosols (SOAs) resulting from combustion products of internal combustion engines, have been identified as a danger to health. Particulate toxicity has been found to vary by region and source contribution which affects the particles chemical composition.

The chemical composition of the aerosol directly affects how it interacts with solar radiation. The chemical constituents within the aerosol change the overall refractive index. The refractive index will determine how much light is scattered and absorbed.

The composition of particulate matter that generally causes visual effects, haze, consists of sulfur dioxide, nitrogen oxides, carbon monoxide, mineral dust, and organic matter. The particles are hygroscopic due to the presence of sulfur, and SO is converted to sulfate when high humidity and low temperatures are present. This causes reduced visibility and yellow color.

Size distribution

The false-color maps in the map of distribution of aerosol particles on this page show where there are natural aerosols, human pollution, or a mixture of both, monthly.

Among the most obvious patterns that the size distribution time series shows is that in the planet's most southerly latitudes, nearly all the aerosols are large, but in the high northern latitudes, smaller aerosols are very abundant. Most of the Southern Hemisphere is covered by the ocean, where the largest source of aerosols is natural sea salt from dried sea spray. Because the land is concentrated in the Northern Hemisphere, the amount of small aerosols from fires and human activities is greater there than in the Southern Hemisphere. Overland, patches of large-radius aerosols appear over deserts and arid regions, most prominently, the Sahara Desert in North Africa and the Arabian Peninsula, where dust storms are common. Places where human-triggered or natural fire activity is common (land-clearing fires in the Amazon from August–October, for example, or lightning-triggered fires in the forests of northern Canada in Northern Hemisphere summer) are dominated by smaller aerosols. Human-produced (fossil fuel) pollution is largely responsible for the areas of small aerosols over densely populated regions such as the eastern United States and Europe, especially in their summer.

Satellite measurements of aerosols, called aerosol optical thickness, are based on the fact that the particles change the way the atmosphere reflects and absorbs visible and infrared light. As shown in the seventh image on this page, an optical thickness of less than 0.1 (palest yellow) indicates a crystal clear sky with maximum visibility, whereas a value of 1 (reddish-brown) indicates very hazy conditions.

Deposition processes 

In general, the smaller and lighter a particle is, the longer it will stay in the air. Larger particles (greater than 10 micrometers in diameter) tend to settle to the ground by gravity in a matter of hours whereas the smallest particles (less than 1 micrometer) can stay in the atmosphere for weeks and are mostly removed by precipitation. There are also evidence that it is not uncommon for aerosols to "travel across the ocean". For example, in September 2017 wildfires burning across the western United States and Canada, and the smoke was found to have arrived over the United Kingdom, and northern France in three days, as shown by satellite images. Diesel particulate matter is highest near the source of emission. Any information regarding DPM and the atmosphere, flora, height, and distance from major sources is useful to determine health effects.

Controlling technologies and measures 

A complicated blend of solid and liquid particles result in particulate matter and these particulate matter emissions are highly regulated in most industrialized countries. Due to environmental concerns, most industries are required to operate some kind of dust collection system to control particulate emissions. These systems include inertial collectors (cyclonic separators), fabric filter collectors (baghouses), electrostatic filters used in facemasks, wet scrubbers, and electrostatic precipitators.

Cyclonic separators are useful for removing large, coarse particles and are often employed as a first step or "pre-cleaner" to other more efficient collectors. Well-designed cyclonic separators can be very efficient in removing even fine particulates, and may be operated continuously without requiring frequent shutdowns for maintenance.

Fabric filters or baghouses are the most commonly employed in general industry. They work by forcing dust-laden air through a bag-shaped fabric filter leaving the particulate to collect on the outer surface of the bag and allowing the now clean air to pass through to either be exhausted into the atmosphere or in some cases recirculated into the facility. Common fabrics include polyester and fiberglass and common fabric coatings include PTFE (commonly known as Teflon). The excess dust buildup is then cleaned from the bags and removed from the collector.

Wet scrubbers pass the dirty air through a scrubbing solution (usually a mixture of water and other compounds) allowing the particulate to attach to the liquid molecules. Electrostatic precipitators electrically charge the dirty air as it passes through. The now charged air then passes through large electrostatic plates which attract the charged particle in the airstream collecting them and leaving the now clean air to be exhausted or recirculated.

For general building construction, some places that have acknowledged the possible health risks of construction dust for decades legally require the relevant contractor to adopt effective dust control measures, although inspections, fines and imprisonment are rare (for example, two prosecutions with a total fines of HKD$6000 in Hong Kong in the year 2021).

Some of the mandatory dust control measures include load, unload, handle, transfer, store or dispose of cement or dry pulverized fuel ash in a completely enclosed system or facility, and fit any vent or exhaust with an effective fabric filter or equivalent air pollution control system or equipment, enclose the scaffolding of the building with dust screens, use impervious sheeting to enclose both material hoist and debris chute, wetten debris with water before it is dumped into a debris chute, have water sprayed on the facade surface before and during grinding work, use grinder equipped with vacuum cleaner for facade grinding work, spray water continuously on the surface for any pneumatic or power-driven drilling, cutting, polishing or other mechanical breaking operation that causes dust emission, unless there is the operation of an effective dust extraction and filtering device, provide hoarding of not less than 2.4 m in height along the whole length of the site boundary, have hard paving on open area and wash every vehicle that leaves the construction sites. Use of automatic sprinkler equipment, automatic carwash equipment and installation of video surveillance system for the pollution control facilities and retain the videos for one month for future inspections.

Besides removing particulates from the source of pollution, it can also be cleaned in the open air (e.g. smog tower, moss wall
 and anti-smog gun), while other control measures employ the use of barriers.

Climate effects

Atmospheric aerosols affect the climate of the earth by changing the amount of incoming solar radiation and outgoing terrestrial longwave radiation retained in the earth's system. This occurs through several distinct mechanisms which are split into direct, indirect and semi-direct aerosol effects. The aerosol climate effects are the biggest source of uncertainty in future climate predictions. The Intergovernmental Panel on Climate Change (IPCC), Third Assessment Report, says:While the radiative forcing due to greenhouse gases may be determined to a reasonably high degree of accuracy... the uncertainties relating to aerosol radiative forcings remain large, and rely to a large extent on the estimates from global modeling studies that are difficult to verify at the present time.

Aerosol radiative

Direct

The direct aerosol effect consists of any direct interaction of radiation with atmospheric aerosols, such as absorption or scattering. It affects both short and longwave radiation to produce a net negative radiative forcing. The magnitude of the resultant radiative forcing due to the direct effect of an aerosol is dependent on the albedo of the underlying surface, as this affects the net amount of radiation absorbed or scattered to space. For example, if a highly scattering aerosol is above a surface of low albedo it has a greater radiative forcing than if it was above a surface of high albedo. The converse is true of absorbing aerosol, with the greatest radiative forcing arising from a highly absorbing aerosol over a surface of high albedo. The direct aerosol effect is a first-order effect and is therefore classified as a radiative forcing by the IPCC. The interaction of an aerosol with radiation is quantified by the single-scattering albedo (SSA), the ratio of scattering alone to scattering plus absorption (extinction) of radiation by a particle. The SSA tends to unity if scattering dominates, with relatively little absorption, and decreases as absorption increases, becoming zero for infinite absorption. For example, the sea-salt aerosol has an SSA of 1, as a sea-salt particle only scatters, whereas soot has an SSA of 0.23, showing that it is a major atmospheric aerosol absorber.

Indirect 
The Indirect aerosol effect consists of any change to the earth's radiative budget due to the modification of clouds by atmospheric aerosols and consists of several distinct effects. Cloud droplets form onto pre-existing aerosol particles, known as cloud condensation nuclei (CCN). Droplets condensing around human-produced aerosols such as found in particulate pollution tend to be smaller and more numerous than those forming around aerosol particles of natural origin (such as windblown dust).

For any given meteorological conditions, an increase in CCN leads to an increase in the number of cloud droplets. This leads to more scattering of shortwave radiation i.e. an increase in the albedo of the cloud, known as the cloud albedo effect, First indirect effect or Twomey effect. Evidence supporting the cloud albedo effect has been observed from the effects of ship exhaust plumes and biomass burning on cloud albedo compared to ambient clouds. The Cloud albedo aerosol effect is a first order effect and therefore classified as a radiative forcing by the IPCC.

An increase in cloud droplet number due to the introduction of aerosol acts to reduce the cloud droplet size, as the same amount of water is divided into more droplets. This has the effect of suppressing precipitation, increasing the cloud lifetime, known as the cloud lifetime aerosol effect, second indirect effect or Albrecht effect. This has been observed as the suppression of drizzle in ship exhaust plume compared to ambient clouds, and inhibited precipitation in biomass burning plumes. This cloud lifetime effect is classified as a climate feedback (rather than a radiative forcing) by the IPCC due to the interdependence between it and the hydrological cycle. However, it has previously been classified as a negative radiative forcing.

Semi-direct
The Semi-direct effect concerns any radiative effect caused by absorbing atmospheric aerosol such as soot, apart from direct scattering and absorption, which is classified as the direct effect. It encompasses many individual mechanisms, and in general is more poorly defined and understood than the direct and indirect aerosol effects. For instance, if absorbing aerosols are present in a layer aloft in the atmosphere, they can heat surrounding air which inhibits the condensation of water vapour, resulting in less cloud formation. Additionally, heating a layer of the atmosphere relative to the surface results in a more stable atmosphere due to the inhibition of atmospheric convection. This inhibits the convective uplift of moisture, which in turn reduces cloud formation. The heating of the atmosphere aloft also leads to a cooling of the surface, resulting in less evaporation of surface water. The effects described here all lead to a reduction in cloud cover i.e. an increase in planetary albedo. The semi-direct effect classified as a climate feedback) by the IPCC due to the interdependence between it and the hydrological cycle. However, it has previously been classified as a negative radiative forcing.

Specific aerosol roles

Sulfate 

Sulfate aerosol has two main effects, direct and indirect. The direct effect, via albedo, is a cooling effect that slows the overall rate of global warming: the IPCC's best estimate of the radiative forcing is −0.4 watts per square meter with a range of −0.2 to −0.8 W/m2. However there are substantial uncertainties. The effect varies strongly geographically, with most cooling believed to be at and downwind of major industrial centers. Modern climate models addressing the attribution of recent climate change take into account sulfate forcing, which appears to account (at least partly) for the slight drop in global temperature in the middle of the 20th century. The indirect effect via the aerosol acting as cloud condensation nuclei (CCN) and thereby modifying the cloud properties (albedo and lifetime) is more uncertain but is believed to be cooling.

Black carbon 
Black carbon (BC), or carbon black, or elemental carbon (EC), often called soot, is composed of pure carbon clusters, skeleton balls and fullerenes, and is one of the most important absorbing aerosol species in the atmosphere. It should be distinguished from organic carbon (OC): clustered or aggregated organic molecules on their own or permeating an EC buckyball.  Black carbon from fossil fuels is estimated by the IPCC in the Fourth Assessment Report of the IPCC, 4AR, to contribute a global mean radiative forcing of +0.2 W/m2 (was +0.1 W/m2 in the Second Assessment Report of the IPCC, SAR), with a range +0.1 to +0.4 W/m2. A study published in 2013 however, states that "the best estimate for the industrial-era (1750 to 2005) direct radiative forcing of atmospheric black carbon is +0.71 W/m2 with 90% uncertainty bounds of (+0.08, +1.27) W/m2" with "total direct forcing by all-black carbon sources, without subtracting the preindustrial background, is estimated as +0.88 (+0.17, +1.48) W/m2".

Instances

Volcanoes are a large natural source of aerosol and have been linked to changes in the earth's climate often with consequences for the human population. Eruptions linked to changes in climate include the 1600 eruption of Huaynaputina which was linked to the Russian famine of 1601–1603, leading to the deaths of two million, and the 1991 eruption of Mount Pinatubo which caused a global cooling of approximately 0.5 °C lasting several years. Research tracking the effect of light-scattering aerosols in the stratosphere during 2000 and 2010 and comparing its pattern to volcanic activity show a close correlation. Simulations of the effect of anthropogenic particles showed little influence at present levels.

Aerosols are also thought to affect weather and climate on a regional scale. The failure of the Indian monsoon has been linked to the suppression of evaporation of water from the Indian Ocean due to the semi-direct effect of anthropogenic aerosol.

Recent studies of the Sahel drought and major increases since 1967 in rainfall in Australia over the Northern Territory, Kimberley, Pilbara and around the Nullarbor Plain have led some scientists to conclude that the aerosol haze over South and East Asia has been steadily shifting tropical rainfall in both hemispheres southward.

Health effects

Size, shape and solubility matter

The size of the particle is the main determinant of where in the respiratory tract the particle will come to rest when inhaled. Larger particles are generally filtered in the nose and throat via cilia and mucus, but particulate matter smaller than about 10 micrometers, can settle in the bronchi and lungs and cause health problems. The 10-micrometer size does not represent a strict boundary between respirable and non-respirable particles but has been agreed upon for monitoring of airborne particulate matter by most regulatory agencies. Because of their small size, particles on the order of 10 micrometers or less (coarse particulate matter, PM) can penetrate the deepest part of the lungs such as the bronchioles or alveoli. When asthmatics are exposed to these conditions it can trigger bronchoconstriction.

Similarly  fine particulate matter (PM), tends to penetrate into the gas exchange regions of the lung (alveoli), and very small particles (ultrafine particulate matter, PM) may pass through the lungs to affect other organs. Penetration of particles is not wholly dependent on their size; shape and chemical composition also play a part. To avoid this complication, simple nomenclature is used to indicate the different degrees of relative penetration of a PM particle into the cardiovascular system. Inhalable particles penetrate no further than the bronchi as they are filtered out by the cilia. Thoracic particles can penetrate right into terminal bronchioles whereas PM, which can penetrate to alveoli, the gas exchange area, and hence the circulatory system are termed respirable particles.

In analogy, the inhalable dust fraction is the fraction of dust entering the nose and mouth which may be deposited anywhere in the respiratory tract. The thoracic fraction is the fraction that enters the thorax and is deposited within the lung's airways. The respirable fraction is what is deposited in the gas exchange regions (alveoli).

The smallest particles, less than 180 nanometers (nanoparticles), may be even more damaging to the cardiovascular system. Nanoparticles can pass through cell membranes and migrate into other organs, including the brain. Particles emitted from modern diesel engines (commonly referred to as Diesel Particulate Matter, or DPM) are typically in the size range of 100 nanometers (0.1 micrometers). These soot particles also carry carcinogens like benzopyrenes adsorbed on their surface. Particulate mass is not a proper measure of the health hazard, because one particle of 10 μm diameter has approximately the same mass as 1 million particles of 100  nm diameter, but is much less hazardous, as it is unlikely to enter the alveoli. Legislative limits for engine emissions based on mass are therefore not protective. Proposals for new regulations exist in some countries, with suggestions to limit the particle surface area or the particle count (numerical quantity) instead.

The site and extent of absorption of inhaled gases and vapors are determined by their solubility in water. Absorption is also dependent upon air flow rates and the partial pressure of the gases in the inspired air. The fate of a specific contaminant is dependent upon the form in which it exists (aerosol or particulate). Inhalation also depends upon the breathing rate of the subject.

Another complexity not entirely documented is how the shape of PM can affect health, except for the needle-like shape of asbestos fibres which can lodge in the lungs. Geometrically angular shapes have more surface area than rounder shapes, which in turn affects the binding capacity of the particle to other, possibly more dangerous substances.

Composition, quantity and duration are important

Composition of particles can vary greatly depending on their sources and how they are produced. For example, dust emitted from the burning of living and dead vegetation would be different from those emitted from the burning of joss paper or construction wastes. Particles emitted from fuel combustion are not the same as those emitted from waste combustion. The particulate matter generated from the fire of a recycling yard or a ship full of scrap metal may contain more toxic substances than other types of burning.

Different types of building refurbishment activities produce different kinds of dust too. The composition of PM generated from cutting or mixing concrete made with Portland Cement would be different from those generated from cutting or mixing concrete made with different types of slag (e.g. GGBFS, EAF slag), fly ash or even EAF dust (EAFD), while EFAD, slag and fly ash are likely to be more toxic as they contain heavy metals. Besides slag cement that is sold as an environmental friendly product, fake (adulterated) cement, where different types of slag, fly ash or other unknown substances are added, is also very common in some places due to the much lower production cost. To address to the quality and toxicity problems, some places are starting to ban the use of EAF slag in cement used in buildings. Composition of welding fumes varies a lot as well and it depends on the metals in the material being welded, the composition of the coatings, electrode, etc, and hence a lot of health problems can be resulted from the different types of toxic emissions.

Besides composition, quantity and duration of exposure are also important, since they would affect the triggering and severity of a disease. Particles that get into indoor would directly affect indoor air quality. Possible secondary contaminations like what happened in third-hand smoke are also of concern.

In a nutshell, while background concentration is important, only "improvement in air quality" or "decrease in ambient concentration of PM" do not necessarily mean better health. The health impact mainly depends on the toxicity (or source) of the particulate matter a person is exposed to, the amount he is exposed to and for how long, and also the size, shape and solubility of the PM.

Since construction and refurbishment projects are prominent sources of particulate matter, it implicates that such projects, which are very common in some places, should be avoided in health facilities that already commenced and under operation as far as possible. For inevitable projects, better plannings and mitigation measures regarding PM emission should be introduced. Use of power tools, heavy equipments, diesel fuels and potentially toxic building materials (e.g. concrete and solder) should be strictly monitored to ensure that patients who are there seeking for disease treatments or chances to survive are not adversely affected.

Health problems 

The effects of inhaling particulate matter that have been widely studied in humans and animals include COVID-19, asthma, lung cancer, respiratory diseases like  silicosis,

 cardiovascular disease, premature delivery, birth defects, low birth weight, developmental disorders, neurodegenerative disorders mental disorders, and premature death.  Outdoor fine particulates with diameter less than 2.5 microns accounts for 4.2 million annual deaths worldwide, and more than 103 million disability-adjusted life-years lost, making it the fifth leading risk factor for death. Air pollution has also been linked to a range of other psychosocial problems. Particulates may cause tissue damage by entering organs directly, or indirectly by systemic inflammation. Adverse impacts may obtain even at exposure levels lower than published air quality standards deemed safe.

Anthropogenic fine particulates as main hazard 
Increased levels of fine particles in the air as a result of anthropogenic particulate air pollution "is consistently and independently related to the most serious effects, including lung cancer and other cardiopulmonary mortality." The association between a large number of deaths and other health problems and particulate pollution was first demonstrated in the early 1970s and has been reproduced many times since. PM pollution is estimated to cause 22,000–52,000 deaths per year in the United States (from 2000) contributed to ~370,000 premature deaths in Europe during 2005. and 3.22 million deaths globally in 2010 per the global burden of disease collaboration. A study by the European Environment Agency estimates that 307,000 people have died prematurely in 2019 due to fine particle pollution in the 27 EU member states.

A study in 2000 conducted in the U.S. explored how fine particulate matter may be more harmful than coarse particulate matter. The study was based on six different cities. They found that deaths and hospital visits that were caused by particulate matter in the air were primarily due to fine particulate matter. Similarly, a 1987 study of American air pollution data found that fine particles and sulfates, as opposed to coarser particles, most consistently and significantly correlated to total annual mortality rates in standard metropolitan statistical areas.

A study published in 2022 in GeoHealth concluded that eliminating energy-related fossil fuel emissions in the United States would prevent 46,900–59,400 premature deaths each year and provide $537–$678 billion in benefits from avoided PM2.5-related illness and death.

Pregnancy, fetuses and birth effects
Higher rates of infertility have been correlated with exposure to particulates.

In addition, inhalation of PM – PM is associated with elevated risk of adverse pregnancy outcomes, such as low birth weight. Maternal PM exposure during pregnancy is also associated with high blood pressure in children. Exposure to PM has been associated with greater reductions in birth weight than exposure to PM. PM exposure can cause inflammation, oxidative stress, endocrine disruption, and impaired oxygen transport access to the placenta, all of which are mechanisms for heightening the risk of low birth weight. Overall epidemiologic and toxicological evidence suggests that a causal relationship exists between long-term exposures to PM and developmental outcomes (i.e. low birth weight). However, studies investigating the significance of trimester-specific exposure have proven to be inconclusive, and results of international studies have been inconsistent in drawing associations of prenatal particulate matter exposure and low birth weight.  As perinatal outcomes have been associated with lifelong health and exposure to particulate matter is widespread, this issue is of critical public health importance and additional research will be essential to inform public policy on the matter.

Cardiovascular and respiratory disease 

A 2002 study indicated that PM leads to high plaque deposits in arteries, causing vascular inflammation and atherosclerosis – a hardening of the arteries that reduces elasticity, which can lead to heart attacks and other cardiovascular problems. A 2014 meta analysis reported that long term exposure to particulate matter is linked to coronary events. The study included 11 cohorts participating in the European Study of Cohorts for Air Pollution Effects (ESCAPE) with 100,166 participants, followed for an average of 11.5 years. An increase in estimated annual exposure to PM 2.5 of just 5 μg/m was linked with a 13% increased risk of heart attacks. In 2017 a study revealed that PM not only affects human cells and tissues, but also impacts bacteria which cause disease in humans. This study concluded that biofilm formation, antibiotic tolerance, and colonisation of both Staphylococcus aureus and Streptococcus pneumoniae was altered by black carbon exposure.

The largest US study on acute health effects of coarse particle pollution between 2.5 and 10 micrometers in diameter was published 2008 and found an association with hospital admissions for cardiovascular diseases but no evidence of an association with the number of hospital admissions for respiratory diseases. After taking into account fine particle levels (PM and less), the association with coarse particles remained but was no longer statistically significant, which means the effect is due to the subsection of fine particles.

The Mongolian government agency recorded a 45% increase in the rate of respiratory illness in the past five years (reported in September 2014). Bronchial asthma, chronic obstructive pulmonary disease, and interstitial pneumonia were the most common ailments treated by area hospitals. Levels of premature death, chronic bronchitis, and cardiovascular disease are increasing at a rapid rate.

Cognitive hazards

The effects of air pollution and particulate matter on cognitive performance has become an active area of research. A recent longitudinal study in China comparing air pollution and particulate exposure with verbal and mathematics test scores found that accumulative exposure impeded verbal test scores of men and women significantly more than the math scores. The negative impact in verbal reasoning as a result of particulate exposure was more pronounced as people aged and affected men more than women. The level of cognitive decline in verbal reasoning scores was more pronounced in less educated (middle school diploma or lower) subjects. Short term exposure to particulate matter has been linked to short term cognitive decline in otherwise healthy adults.

Air pollution, particulate matter and wood smoke may also cause brain damage and increase the risk of developmental disorders, neurodegenerative disorders mental disorders, and suicide, although studies on the link between depression and some air pollutants are not consistent. At least one study has identified "the abundant presence in the human brain of magnetite nanoparticles that match precisely the high-temperature magnetite nanospheres, formed by combustion and/or friction-derived heating, which are prolific in urban, airborne particulate matter (PM)."

Particulates also appear to have a role in the pathogenesis of Alzheimer's disease and premature brain aging

Increased death 
The World Health Organization (WHO) estimated in 2005 that "... fine particulate air pollution (PM(2.5)), causes about 3% of mortality from cardiopulmonary disease, about 5% of mortality from cancer of the trachea, bronchus, and lung, and about 1% of mortality from acute respiratory infections in children under 5 years, worldwide." A 2011 study concluded that traffic exhaust is the single most serious preventable cause of heart attack in the general public, the cause of 7.4% of all attacks.

Particulate matter studies in Bangkok, Thailand from 2008 indicated a 1.9% increased risk of dying from cardiovascular disease, and 1.0% risk of all disease for every 10 micrograms per cubic meter. Levels averaged 65 in 1996, 68 in 2002, and 52 in 2004. Decreasing levels may be attributed to conversions of diesel to natural gas combustion as well as improved regulations.

Racial disparities 
There have been many studies linking race to increased proximity to particulate matter, and thus susceptibility to adverse health effects that go in tandem with long term exposure. In a study analyzing the effects of air pollution on racially segregated neighborhoods in the United States, results show that "the proportions of Black residents in a tract was linked to higher asthma rates". Many scholars link this disproportionality to racial housing segregation and their respective inequalities in "toxic exposures". This reality is made worse by the finding that "health care occurs in the context of broader historic and contemporary social and economic inequality and persistent racial and ethnic discrimination in many sectors of American life". Residential proximity to particulate emitting facilities increases exposure to PM 2.5 which is linked to increased morbidity and mortality rates. Multiple studies confirm the burden of PM emissions is higher among non-White and poverty ridden populations, though some say that income does not drive these differences. This correlation between race and housing related health repercussions stems from a longstanding environmental justice problem linked to the practice of historic redlining. An example of these factors contextualized is an area of Southeastern Louisiana, colloquially dubbed 'Cancer Alley' for its high concentration of cancer related deaths due to neighboring chemical plants. Cancer Alley being a majority African American community, with the neighborhood nearest to the plant being 90% Black, perpetuates the scientific narrative that Black populations are located disproportionately closer to areas of high PM output than White populations. A 2020 article relates the long term health effects of living in high PM concentrations to increased risk, spread, and mortality rates from the SARS-CoV-2 or COVID-19, and faults a history of racism for this outcome.

Wildfire smoke risk
There is an increased risk of particulate exposure in regions where wildfires are persistent. Smoke from wildfires may impact sensitive groups such as the elderly, children, pregnant women, and people with lung, and cardiovascular disease. A study found that in the 2008 wildfire season in California, the particulate matter was much more toxic to human lungs, as increased neutrophil infiltrate, cell influx and edema was observed versus particulate matter from ambient air. Furthermore, particulate matter from wildfires have been linked to be a triggering factor of acute coronary events such as ischemic heart disease. Wildfires also have been associated with increased emergency department visits due to particulate matter exposure, as well as an increased risk of asthma related events. Furthermore, a link between PM2.5 from wildfires and increased risk of hospitalizations for cardiopulmonary diseases has been discovered.

Energy industry knowledge and response to adverse health effects
Major energy companies understood at least since the 1960s that use of their products causes widespread adverse health effects and death but continued aggressive political lobbying in the United States and elsewhere against clean air regulation and launched major corporate propaganda campaigns to sow doubt regarding the causative link between the burning of fossil fuels and major risks to human life. Internal company memoranda reveal that energy industry scientists and executives knew that air pollutants created by fossil fuels lodge deep in human lung tissue, and cause birth defects in children of oil industry workers. The industry memos acknowledge that automobiles "are by far the greatest sources of air pollution" and also that air pollution causes adverse health effects and lodges toxins, including carcinogens, "deep into the lungs which would otherwise be removed in the throat."

In response to mounting public concern, the industry eventually created the Global Climate Coalition, an industry lobby group, to derail governments' attempts to regulate air pollution and to create confusion in the public mind about the necessity of such regulation. Similar lobbying and corporate public relations efforts were undertaken by the American Petroleum Institute, a trade association of the oil and gas industry, and the climate change denier private think tank, The Heartland Institute. "The response from fossil-fuel interests has been from the same playbook – first they know, then they scheme, then they deny and then they delay. They've fallen back on delay, subtle forms of propaganda and the undermining of regulation," said Geoffrey Supran, a Harvard University researcher of the history of fossil-fuel companies and climate change.  These efforts have been compared, by policy analysts such as Carroll Muffett of the Center for International Environmental Law, to the tobacco industry strategy of lobbying and corporate propaganda campaigns to create doubt regarding the causal connection between cigarette smoking and cancer and to forestall its regulation. In addition, industry-funded advocates, when appointed to senior government positions in the United States, have revised scientific findings showing the deadly effects of air pollution and have rolled back its regulation.

Effects on vegetation
Particulate matter can clog stomatal openings of plants and interfere with photosynthesis functions. In this manner, high particulate matter concentrations in the atmosphere can lead to growth stunting or mortality in some plant species.

Regulation
Due to the highly toxic health effects of particulate matter, most governments have created regulations both for the emissions allowed from certain types of pollution sources (motor vehicles, industrial emissions etc.) and for the ambient concentration of particulates. The IARC and WHO designate particulates a Group 1 carcinogen. Particulates are the deadliest form of air pollution due to their ability to penetrate deep into the lungs and blood streams unfiltered, causing respiratory diseases, heart attacks, and premature death. In 2013, the ESCAPE study involving 312,944 people in nine European countries revealed that there was no safe level of particulates and that for every increase of 10 μg/m in PM, the lung cancer rate rose 22%. For PM there was a 36% increase in lung cancer per 10 μg/m. In a 2014 meta-analysis of 18 studies globally including the ESCAPE data, for every increase of 10 μg/m in PM, the lung cancer rate rose 9%.

Australia

Australia has set limits for particulates in the air:

Canada

In Canada the standard for particulate matter is set nationally by the federal-provincial Canadian Council of Ministers of the Environment (CCME). Jurisdictions (provinces and territories) may set more stringent standards. The CCME standard for particulate matter 2.5 (PM) as of 2015 is 28 μg/m (calculated using the 3-year average of the annual 98th percentile of the daily 24-hr average concentrations) and 10 μg/m3 (3-year average of annual mean). PM standards will increase in stringency in 2020.

China

China has set limits for particulates in the air:

European Union

The European Union has established the European emission standards, which include limits for particulates in the air:

Hong Kong

Hong Kong has set limits for particulates in the air:

Japan

Japan has set limits for particulates in the air:

South Korea

South Korea has set limits for particulates in the air:

Taiwan

Taiwan has set limits for particulates in the air:

United States

The United States Environmental Protection Agency (EPA) has set standards for PM and PM concentrations. (See National Ambient Air Quality Standards.)

California

In October 2008, the Department of Toxic Substances Control (DTSC), within the California Environmental Protection Agency, announced its intent to request information regarding analytical test methods, fate and transport in the environment, and other relevant information from manufacturers of carbon nanotubes. DTSC is exercising its authority under the California Health and Safety Code, Chapter 699, sections 57018-57020. These sections were added as a result of the adoption of Assembly Bill AB 289 (2006). They are intended to make information on the fate and transport, detection and analysis, and other information on chemicals more available. The law places the responsibility to provide this information to the Department on those who manufacture or import the chemicals.

On 22 January 2009, a formal information request letter was sent to manufacturers who produce or import carbon nanotubes in California, or who may export carbon nanotubes into the State. This letter constitutes the first formal implementation of the authorities placed into statute by AB 289 and is directed to manufacturers of carbon nanotubes, both industry, and academia within the State, and to manufacturers outside California who export carbon nanotubes to California. This request for information must be met by the manufacturers within one year. DTSC is waiting for the upcoming 22 January 2010 deadline for responses to the data call-in.

The California Nano Industry Network and DTSC hosted a full-day symposium on 16 November 2009 in Sacramento, California. This symposium provided an opportunity to hear from nanotechnology industry experts and discuss future regulatory considerations in California.

DTSC is expanding the Specific Chemical Information Call-in to members of the nanometal oxides, the latest information can be found on their website.

Colorado

Key points in the Colorado Plan include reducing emission levels and solutions by sector. Agriculture, transportation, green electricity, and renewable energy research are the main concepts and goals in this plan. Political programs such as mandatory vehicle emissions testing and the prohibition of smoking indoors are actions taken by local government to create public awareness and participation in cleaner air. The location of Denver next to the Rocky Mountains and wide expanse of plains makes the metro area of Colorado's capital city a likely place for smog and visible air pollution.

Affected areas 

The most concentrated particulate matter pollution resulting from the burning of fossil fuels by transportation and industrial sources tends to be in densely populated metropolitan areas in developing countries, such as Delhi and Beijing.

Australia
PM10 pollution in coal mining areas in Australia such as the Latrobe Valley in Victoria and the Hunter Region in New South Wales significantly increased during 2004 to 2014. Although the increase did not significantly add to non-attainment statistics the rate of increase has risen each year during 2010 to 2014.

China
Some cities in Northern China and South Asia have had concentrations above 200 μg/m up to a few years ago. The PM levels in Chinese cities have been extreme in recent years, reaching an all-time high in Beijing on 12 January 2013, of 993 μg/m.

To monitor the air quality of south China, the U.S. Consulate Guangzhou set a PM2.5 and PM10 monitor on Shamian Island in Guangzhou and displays readings on its official website and social platforms.

Ulaanbaatar 
Mongolia's capital city Ulaanbaatar has an annual average mean temperature of about 0 °C, making it the world's coldest capital city. About 40% of the population lives in apartments, 80% of which are supplied with central heating systems from three combined heat and power plants. In 2007, the power plants consumed almost 3.4 million tons of coal. The pollution control technology is in poor condition. 

The other 60% of the population reside in shantytowns (Ger districts), which have developed due to the country's new market economy and the very cold winter seasons. The poor in these districts cook and heat their wood houses with indoor stoves fueled by wood or coal. The resulting air pollution is characterized by raised sulfur dioxide and nitrogen oxide levels and very high concentrations of airborne particles and particulate matter (PM).
Annual seasonal average particulate matter concentrations have been recorded as high as 279 μg/m (micrograms per cubic meter). The World Health Organization's recommended annual mean PM level is 20 μg/m, which means that Ulaanbaatar's PM annual mean levels are 14 times higher than recommended.

During the winter months, in particular, the air pollution obscures the air, affecting the visibility in the city to such an extent that airplanes on some occasions are prevented from landing at the airport.

In addition to stack emissions, another source unaccounted for in the emission inventory is fly ash from ash ponds, the final disposal place for fly ash that has been collected in settling tanks. Ash ponds are continually eroded by wind during the winter.

See also 

Air quality index
Air quality law
Atherosclerosis
Bioaerosol
Chronic obstructive pulmonary disease
Cleanroom
Criteria air contaminants
Environmental impact of the coal industry
Exercise-induced bronchoconstriction
Fog
Fugitive dust
Global dimming
List of most polluted cities by particulate matter concentration
Microplastics
National Ambient Air Quality Standards
Non-exhaust emissions
Pea soup fog
Pneumoconiosis
Pulmonary emphysema
Pulmonary fibrosis
Respirator
Scrubber
Sawdust
Ultrafine particles

Notes

References

Further reading 
  

Voiland, Adam. "Aerosols: Tiny Particles, Big Impact." NASA, 2 Nov. 2010, Aerosols: Tiny Particles, Big Impact 
 The Intergovernmental Panel on Climate Change (the principal international scientific body on climate change) chapter on atmospheric aerosols and their radiative effects
 InsideEPA.com, Study Links Air Toxics To Heart Disease In Mice Amid EPA Controversy
 Preining, Othmar and E. James Davis (eds.), "History of Aerosol Science," Österreichische Akademie der Wissenschaften,  (Pbk.)
 G Invernizzi et al., Particulate matter from tobacco versus diesel car exhaust: an educational perspective. Tobacco Control 13, S.219–221 (2004)

JEFF CHARLTON Pandemic planning: a review of respirator and mask protection levels.
 Hinds, William C., Aerosol Technology: Properties, Behavior, and Measurement of Airborne Particles, Wiley-Interscience, 
Zangari, Shelby et al., Air quality changes in New York City during the COVID-19 pandemic. Science of the Total Environment 742 (2020)
NARSTO (2004) Particulate Matter Science for Policy Makers: A NARSTO Assessment. P. McMurry, M. Shepherd, and J. Vickery, eds. Cambridge University Press, Cambridge, England. .

External links 

Control of dust from construction and demolition activities
Controlling construction dust with on-tool extraction (4 page PDF with photos)
Beware of dust - Hilti Canada
Dust control - Hilti Hong Kong
What is Local Exhaust Ventilation (LEV)?
Welding fume: protect your workers
Current global map of PM distribution
Current global map of PM and PM distribution
Current global map of PM, PM and PM distribution
Current global map of the aerosol optical thickness of organic matter in green light
Pollution Facts by Air Quality Life Index

 
Aerosols
Pollutants
Visibility
Air pollution
Climate forcing
Articles containing video clips
Pollution